Marius Aventicensis or, popularly, Marius of Avenches (532 – 31 December 596) was the Bishop of Aventicum (modern Avenches) from 574, remembered for his terse chronicle. After his death in Lausanne, he was venerated in that city as a saint, and his feast day was celebrated on 9 or 12 February.

Life

What is known of him, aside from his chronicle, is from the inscription on his tomb in the church of Saint Thyrsus in Lausanne He came of a distinguished, rich family, probably Gallo-Roman in their culture. In 574 he was made Bishop of Aventicum, took part in the Second Council of Mâcon in 585, and shortly afterwards transferred his episcopal see from Aventicum, which was rapidly declining, to Lausanne.

His metrical tomb inscription of unknown date, published in Gallia Christiana, extols him as an ideal bishop; as a skilled goldsmith who made the sacred liturgical vessels with his own hands; as a protector and benefactor of the poor who ploughed his own land; as a man of prayer, and as a scholar. In 587 he consecrated a proprietary church built at his expense on property of his own at Paterniacum (Payerne). The church of Saint Thyrsus was rededicated at an early date to Saint Marius.

Chronicle writer

His brief chronicle is a continuation of the Chronicon Imperiale usually said to be the chronicle of Prosper of Aquitaine. Considering himself a Roman, Marius dated the years by the consuls and the emperors of the Eastern Roman Empire. It covers the years from 455 to 581, and is a valuable source for Burgundian and Franconian history, especially for the second half of the 6th century, "and serves to correct the bias of Gregory of Tours against the Arians of Burgundy" Marius is the first to use the term variola (smallpox) to describe an epidemic that afflicted Gaul and Italy in 570.

The chronicle has been frequently published: first by Pierre-François Chifflet in André Duchesne's Historiæ Francorum Scriptores, I (1636), 210–214; again by Migne in Patrologia Latina, LXXII, 793–802; by Theodor Mommsen in Monumenta Germaniae Historica, Auctores antiqui, XI (1893), 232–9; and by Justin Favrod with a French translation, La chronique de Marius d'Avenches (455–581) (Lausanne 1991).

Notes

Further reading 
 Justin Favrod, "Les sources et la chronologie de Marius d'Avenches", Francia 17 (1990), pp. 1–22.

External links
Online MGH version of the Chronicle
Catholic Encyclopedia : St. Marius Aventicus
Henry Wace, Dictionary of Christian Biography: Marius, bp. of Lausanne, from the Christian Classics Ethereal library, originally published in 1911, republished in 1999
 Chronicon (in Latin)

532 births
596 deaths
6th-century Frankish bishops
6th-century Latin writers
6th-century historians
People from Avenches
Marii
6th-century Frankish saints
6th-century Frankish writers
Bishops of Lausanne